Edward Payson Terhune (November 22, 1830 – May 25, 1907) was an American theologian and author.

He was born on November 22, 1830 in New Brunswick, New Jersey. He graduated from Rutgers University in 1850. He then studied theology at the New Brunswick Theological Seminary. In 1854 he was ordained to the ministry of the Presbyterian church in Virginia, becoming pastor of the congregation at Charlotte Court-House, Virginia.

In 1859 he moved to Newark, New Jersey and took charge of the Old First Presbyterian Church. Rutgers gave him the degree of D.D. in 1869. He was the American chaplain at Rome, Italy, in 1876-1877. He returned to the United States in 1878, and was pastor of a Congregational church in Springfield, Massachusetts, from 1879 till 1884, when he took charge of a Reformed church in Brooklyn, New York.

He married Mary Virginia Hawes in 1856.

They had six children, three dying in infancy: the survivors were Christine Terhune Herrick, Albert Payson Terhune, and Virginia Terhune Van de Water. He died on May 25, 1907.

Publications
The Fallacy of Christian Science (King, 1890)
The Lower James: A Sketch of Certain Colonial Plantations  (privately published, 1907)
Sermons, Vol. 1  (Biblio, 1927)

References

External links
 

New Brunswick, New Jersey
American Presbyterian ministers
1830 births
1907 deaths
Rutgers University alumni
19th-century American clergy